Garfield Anderson (May 7, 1887 – June 1, 1965) was an Ontario political figure. He represented Fort William in the Legislative Assembly of Ontario from 1943 to 1948 as a Co-operative Commonwealth Federation member.

He was born in Allenford, Ontario, the son of Duncan Anderson and Elizabeth Perkins. In 1912, he married Laura Margaret Foster. He worked as a barber, and also served as the director of a credit union and a consumer cooperative society. Anderson went overseas with the 141st Battalion during World War I. He served on the council for Fort William and was mayor from 1943 to 1948.

References 
 Canadian Parliamentary Guide, 1947, PG Normandin
 F. Brent Scollie, Thunder Bay Mayors & Councillors 1873-1945 (Thunder Bay Historical Museum Society, 2000), 158.

External links 

1887 births
1965 deaths
20th-century Canadian legislators
Mayors of Fort William, Ontario
Ontario Co-operative Commonwealth Federation MPPs